A Celebration of Endings is the eighth studio album by Scottish alternative rock band Biffy Clyro. It was produced by Rich Costey and was released on 14 August 2020. It debuted at number one on the UK Albums Chart, making it the band's third consecutive studio album to top the chart.

Background 
The band confirmed they were working on new material in an NME interview in July 2019, having released their soundtrack album Balance, Not Symmetry a few months earlier. Another NME interview in October 2019 confirmed the release of the album, with the working title Opus 8, for the 'first half of next year'.

The first single, "Instant History", was released on 20 February 2020, and first played on Annie Mac's BBC Radio 1 show.

The album was initially planned for release of 15 May 2020, but was pushed back to 14 August due to difficulties surrounding the COVID-19 pandemic.

Critical reception 
The album received critical acclaim upon release. On review aggregate website Metacritic, the album has an average score of 84 out of 100, indicating "universal acclaim," based on 16 reviews. Kerrang! gave the album a perfect score, stating that "Biffy Clyro have delivered an album of restless invention, substance and style that arrives like a spray of water on the arid expanse of this saddest of summers." The Independent also gave the album a positive review, writing that the album "soothes, shakes and surprises at every turn".

Track listing

Personnel
Biffy Clyro
 Simon Neil – lead vocals, guitars
 James Johnston – bass guitar, backing vocals
 Ben Johnston – drums, backing vocals, percussion

Additional personnel
 Zac Rae – additional keyboards
 Steve Mac – additional Keyboards
 Rob Mathes – string arrangements and conducting
 Jenny Nendick – conducting
 Jackie Shave – concertmaster (1st violin)
 Magnus Johnston – violin
 Perry Montague-Mason – violin
 Patrick Kiernan – violin
 Pete Hanson – violin
 Natalia Bonner – violin
 Cathy Thompson – violin
 Debbie Widdup – violin
 Jonathan Evans-Jones – violin
 Chris Tombling – violin
 Bruce White – viola
 Peter Lale – viola
 Rachel Roberts – viola
 Caroline Dearley – cello
 Ian Burdge – cello
 Jonathan Williams – cello
 Caroline Dearley – cello

Production
 Rich Costey – production, mixing
 Steve Mac – production
 James Rushent – additional production
 Chris Laws – additional programming and engineering
 Joe La Porta – mastering
 Jonathan Allen – string recording
 Paul Pritchard – string recording assistant
 Neil Dawes – string recording assistant
 KT Pipal – engineering
 Mario Borgatta – engineering
 Wesley M. Seidman – engineering
 Cecil Barlett – engineering
 Dann Pursey – engineering
 Koby Merman – additional mix engineering and digital editing
 Dalton Ricks – additional mix engineering
 Ross Newbauer – additional mix engineering

Artwork and design
 Thomas Robson – cover artwork 
 Simon Neil – additional artwork, art direction
 Richard Welland – art direction
 Ash Reynolds – photography

Charts

Certifications

Notes

References 

2020 albums
Biffy Clyro albums
Warner Records albums